Columnea gloriosa is commonly known as the goldfish plant (a name it shares with a number of other species), because of the fish shaped flowers it produces. It falls into the genus Columnea. Also known as a cousin to African violets. This plant is in the family Gesneriaceae. Some authorities have it as a synonym of Columnea microcalyx. Origins are from Central and South America and the Caribbean.

Description 
Columnea gloriosa is known for the red long tubular shaped flowers appearing like leaping fish. Oblanceolate leaves with reddish hairs that help distinguish them from other hybrids. A mature plant will grow cascading stems up to 3 feet in length which work well in a hanging basket. If conditions are right this plant will produce many blooms along the stem if supplied with the right nutrients. This hybrid prefers high indirect light with constant moisture during growing season, allow ample time to dry out between watering. Keep in humid conditions to keep bottom leaves from falling off, and temperatures above 65 °F.

References 

gloriosa